Lukasz Labuch is a Paralympic athlete from Poland competing mainly in category T37 sprint events.

Lukasz competed in the 2004 Summer Paralympics winning a silver medal in the T37 100m, he also finished fourth in the 200m and eighth in the long jump.

References

Paralympic athletes of Poland
Athletes (track and field) at the 2004 Summer Paralympics
Paralympic silver medalists for Poland
Living people
Place of birth missing (living people)
Medalists at the 2004 Summer Paralympics
Year of birth missing (living people)
Paralympic medalists in athletics (track and field)
Polish male sprinters
20th-century Polish people
21st-century Polish people